The 1926 Cal Poly Mustangs football team represented California Polytechnic School—now known as California Polytechnic State University, San Luis Obispo—as a member of the California Coast Conference (CCC) during the 1926 college football season. Led by sixth-year head coach Al Agosti, Cal Poly compiled an overall record of 5–4 with a mark of 1–3 in conference play. The team outscored its opponents 119 to 111 for the season. The Mustangs played home games in San Luis Obispo, California.

Cal Poly was a two-year school until 1941.

Schedule

References

Cal Poly
Cal Poly Mustangs football seasons
Cal Poly Mustangs football